RiverCity Ferries is a public transport company which commenced operating ferry services in Brisbane on 4 November 2020. It is a subsidiary of the Kelsian Group.

RiverCity Ferries operates 32 vessels serving 21 wharves on the Brisbane River under a ten-year contract (with an optional five-year extension) with the Brisbane City Council. The company won the contract from the previous operator, Transdev Brisbane Ferries.

Services

CityCat
CityCat services operate from University of Queensland to Northshore Hamilton calling at West End, Guyatt Park, Regatta, Milton, North Quay, South Bank, QUT Gardens Point, Riverside, Sydney Street, Mowbray Park, New Farm Park, Hawthorne, Bulimba, Teneriffe, Bretts Wharf and Apollo Road. Not all CityCat services stop all stops, with some peak time express services operating.

CityHopper
CityHopper is an inner city service between North Quay and Sydney Street, stopping at South Bank, Maritime Museum, Riverside and Holman Street.

Cross River
Cross River consists of cross-river services at two locations.
 Bulimba  Teneriffe
 Holman Street  Riverside known as the Kangaroo Point Cross River Service.

Changes from 15 November 2020
Some services which were suspended by Brisbane City Council on 20 July 2020, were either cancelled or reintroduced by RiverCity Ferries as follows:- 
The Norman Park Cross River service was cancelled permanently.
Resumed services were:
The Kangaroo Point Cross River service no longer stops at Thornton Street and Eagle Street, and instead operates from Holman Street to Riverside wharf only.
Likewise the CityHopper service no longer stops at Dockside, Thornton Street and Eagle Street. Riverside Wharf can be used instead of Eagle Street.
The resumed services use the leased KittyCat catamarans.

Fleet
When operations commenced in November 2020, RiverCity Ferries's fleet consisted of 23 CityCats, three CityHoppers (none in service), six CityFerries (only one in service) and five KittyCats. All except the KittyCats are owned by Brisbane City Council. The KittyCats are leased from Captain Cook Cruises.

CityCat ferries
The CityCat vessels are catamarans, and named after the Aboriginal place names for various parts of the Brisbane River and adjacent areas (with the exception of the 19th CityCat, the Spirit of Brisbane, which honours the 2011 flood recovery volunteers). All CityCats are operated by a crew of three - a master, a deck hand and a ticket seller.

First generation
First generation CityCats have a capacity of 149 passengers. These are to be replaced by additional fourth generation vessels.

Second generation
Second generation CityCats have a capacity of 162 passengers.

Third generation
Third generation CityCats have a capacity of 162 passengers.

Fourth generation
Seven fourth generation CityCats are being delivered from late 2019. They have a capacity of 170 passengers, including 20 on an open upper deck, plus more space for wheelchairs and bicycles than earlier generations. The vessels which each cost $3.7 million, are being constructed at Murarrie by Aus Ships Group.

In December 2019, Brisbane City Council awarded Aus Ships Group a contract for an additional six fourth generation CityCats to replace the first generation vessels at a cost of $3.73 million each.

{| class="wikitable sortable" style="width: 100%"
|-
!Name!!MMSI!!Call sign!!Builder!!Launched!!Namesake!!Reference!!Image
|-
|Yoogera||503092890||456106||Aus Ships||October 2019||Mouth of Breakfast Creek||||
|-
|Neville Bonner||503102970||457882||Aus Ships||August 2020||Neville Bonner||||
|-
|Mianjin II||503110450||458416||Aus Ships|| May 2021||Gardens Point|| ||
|-
|Barrambin II||||||Aus Ships|| ||Breakfast Creek
|||
|-
|Mooroolbin II||503131370||459861||Aus Ships||May 2022||Hamilton Sandbank||||
|-
|Kurilpa II||503138850||459862||Aus Ships|| December 2022||West End|| ||
|-
|City Cat 28||||||Aus Ships|| ||Temporary yard name||||
|-
|}

CityHopper ferries
CityHopper is the inner city ferry service. As of October 2020, these vessels were currently out of service due to alleged issues with major maintenance.

CityFerry ferries
CityFerry covers shorter distance and cross-river services. All of these vessels are currently out of service due to alleged deterioration of their wooden hulls, except Kalparrin which has a steel hull.

KittyCats

Five  catamarans, nicknamed KittyCats, are being leased from RiverCity Ferries sister company Captain Cook Cruises in Sydney from November 2020 to operate the suspended CityHopper and cross river services while monohulled ferries are overhauled. The first, MV Cockle Bay'', arrived in Brisbane in September 2020, to fill in for suspended cross-river ferries awaiting repairs. They have a capacity of 60 passengers (36 seated, 24 standing) and are operated by a crew of one.

Residents have expressed concerns with the noise of the new vessels, since they came into service. In May 2021, Council ordered SeaLink to fit mufflers to the vessels to reduce noise concerns.

Network
The wharves are given in geographical order, heading upstream along the Brisbane River.

References

Companies based in Brisbane
Ferry companies of Queensland
Public transport in Brisbane
Translink (Queensland)
Transport companies established in 2020
2020 establishments in Australia